1510 (one thousand five hundred [and] ten) is the natural number following 1509 and preceding 1511. 


In mathematics
 1510 is an even number.
 1510 is a composite number.
 1510 is a deficient number.
 1510 is an odious number.
 1510 is an apocalyptic power (21510 contains the consecutive digits 666).
 1510 is a square-free integer.
 1510 is an untouchable number.
 1510 is a subprime number (1510 + 1 = 1511, which is a prime).
 1510 is one less than an equidigital number.
 If one leading zero is added to 1510, it becomes a palindromic number.

References to 1510

 It is common knowledge that the character limit for messages sent using Pidgin is 1510.
 1510 kHz was the broadcast frequency for WPGR, Pittsburgh's Gospel Radio station.
 1510 Charlois is the name of an asteroid.
 Tata 1510/1512 is the largest selling bus model seen regularly in India and neighboring countries and the Seychelles.
 1510 is the ID of the USS Walter D. Munson

See also
 1510 AD
 Number

References

External links
 The Positive Integer 1510
 Number Gossip: 1510

Integers